Mount Frome is a locality in New South Wales, Australia.
Historians say that the name 'Frome' comes from a shepherd boy, Tom Frome, who disappeared in the wilderness and was feared dead. During his memorial service, he returned, alive.

References

Localities in New South Wales
Towns in the Central West (New South Wales)